Fabricio Nieva (born July 30, 1974) is a retired male lightweight boxer from Argentina, who represented his native country at the 1996 Summer Olympics in Atlanta, Georgia. There he was defeated in the second round of the men's lightweight division (– 60 kg) by South Korea's Shin Eun-Chul on points (11-27).

References
 sports-reference

1974 births
Living people

Lightweight boxers
Boxers at the 1996 Summer Olympics
Olympic boxers of Argentina
Argentine male boxers